Expressway R8 (R8) is a planned expressway in Slovakia, which after construction will connect Nitra, Topoľčany and Bánovce nad Bebravou. The expressway will lead in the corridor R1 and R2 . The total length of R8 will be 54.64116 km and no European road will run along it. The construction of the expressway is expected only in the distant horizon after 2030, while it is not excluded that the need for its construction will be reassessed. According to the current plans of the Ministry of Transport, no sections of the R8 road will be constructed or open until 2028. With regard to the current intentions of the Ministry of Transport, the operation of the expressway along the entire length of the route cannot be expected before the year 2050.

History 
The inclusion of this stretch in Slovakia's expressway network was considered long ago, but the government of the Slovak Republic gave a definitive promise to prepare studies and documents for the start of construction by resolution no. 492/2008.

Originally, R8 was expected to flow into R2 near the village of Hradište, but in the end the route after Bánovce nad Bebravou was preferred. At the environmental impact assessment (EIA) stage, the feasibility of three main variants with lengths of 54.64116 km, 56.54203 km and 53.74952 km is assessed.

The R8 expressway was included in the list of expressways upon the entry into force of the Act on Road Traffic 1. February 2009.

Overview of R8 expressway sections

Route 
The R8 expressway is designed in the R24.5/120 category, i.e. the width of its crown will be 24.5 meters and the design speed 120 km per hour. The route of the R8 expressway will start at the intersection with R1 Lehota near the city of Nitra. It will continue in a northwesterly direction around Lužianek and Zbehov, later it will copy the route  I/64. Near the village Jelšovce (13.693 km), there will be a delta-shaped non-level crossing (MÚK) Výčapy-Opatovce (Jelšovce) and a bridge overpass crossing the railway line, road I/64 and meanders nitra rivers. The expressway route will continue to cross several dirt roads and roads III. classes, international gas pipeline and high-voltage power lines. At kilometer 25.245, a large one-sided rest area accessible from both driving directions is proposed. Further, at kilometer 32.775, the trumpet-shaped MÚK Topoľčany will be located, and the Administration and Maintenance Center (SSÚR) will also be built next to the feeder. After this intersection, the route will cross the valley level of the river Bebrava and will head towards the deltaic MÚK Ostratice, which will be located at kilometer 47.620. The R8 will then turn in a large arc to the north to the northwest, until it reaches the trumpet-shaped MÚK with the R2 near Bánovce nad Bebravou (km 54.519 - 54.64116).

See also
 Highways in Slovakia
 Transport in Slovakia
 Controlled-access highway
 Limited-access road

References

External links
 Highways portal by INEKO Institute (slovak)
 R8 exits

Highways in Slovakia